The Men's 800 metres T12 event at the 2012 Summer Paralympics took place at the London Olympic Stadium from 3 to 5 September.

Records
Prior to the competition, the existing World and Paralympic records were as follows:

Results

Round 1
Competed 3 September 2012 from 12:16. Qual. rule: winner of each heat (Q) plus best second place (q) qualified.

Heat 1

Heat 2

Heat 3

Final
Competed 5 September 2012 at 19:35.

 
Q = qualified by place. q = qualified by time. PB = Personal Best. SB = Seasonal Best. DNS = Did not start.

References

Athletics at the 2012 Summer Paralympics
2012 in men's athletics